Clive Wilkins (born 25 June 1954) is a British figurative artist. He is the author of The Moustachio Quartet, a series of novels that explore perception and the subjective experience of thinking; and with Nicky Clayton is co-founder of the Captured Thought, an arts and science collaboration. He is the first Artist in Residence in the Department of Psychology at The University of Cambridge, a position held since 2012. Wilkins, along with Clayton, was made Honorary Director of Studies and advisor to the China UK Development Centre (CUDC) in 2018. He has been awarded professorships by Nanjing University, Institute of Technology, China (2018), Beijing University of Language and Culture, China (2019), and Hangzhou Diangi University, China (2019). Wilkins was made Co-Director of the Cambridge Centre for the Integration of Science, Technology and Culture (CCISTC) in 2020.

Education
Clive Wilkins was born in Wolverhampton, Staffs, and grew up and was educated in Corby, Northants. He went on to the Tresham Institute, Kettering, (formerly Kettering Technical College) where he enrolled on the art foundation course at the age of 17. Amongst others, his tutors were David Imms, who taught painting and printmaking, and Norman Laing, who taught architecture and the history of art. He went from there to DeMontfort University, (formerly Leicester Polytechnic) where he was tutored and greatly influenced by George Him, and also came into contact with Jerzy Karo, the Head of School for Graphic Design. Wilkins graduated with a Bachelor of Arts with Honours in Graphic Design, before gaining an Art Teacher's Diploma (ATD) and Post Graduate Diploma in Education (PGCE).

Paintings

Wilkins has exhibited in the John Player Portrait Awards (1985, 1986, 1987) and in the BP Portrait Awards (1994, 1995).

Wilkins has produced portraits of the British pop artist Sir Peter Blake RA and Sir Howard Hodgkin CH CBE amongst others, and was presented to HRH Princess Royal during a visit to the Royal Holloway University in 1994.

Wilkins' work appears in The Creatures in the Night, a published picture book sequence of 31 paintings, with accompanying text by the artist. The artwork, along with other works by Wilkins, formed a one-man show (2005) at Petley Fine Art Limited, Cork Street, London. He was described, in the foreword to the exhibition catalogue by Roy Petley as "one of the UK's leading figurative painters".

Wilkins paintings have been exhibited in a number of venues, including the following:

 Royal Academy Summer Exhibition, London, 1984
 National Portrait Gallery, London, 1985
 Royal Academy Summer Exhibition, London, 1986
 Royal Academy Summer Exhibition, London, 1994
 National Portrait Gallery, London, 1995

The Captured Thought
Wilkins, along with Nicky Clayton, Professor of Comparative Cognition at the University of Cambridge, is co-founder of "The Captured Thought". The collaboration explores the nature of memory and perception with a particular focus on creativity. Important aspects of The Captured Thought's work have been highlighted in articles in 'The Guardian' newspaper in 2019  and in 'Die Zeit' magazine in 2020.  The Captured Thought were invited speakers at The University of Vienna’s CogSciHub inauguration 2019,and India's National Brain Research Centre 16th Foundation Day. Their work featured in the New Scientist Special Christmas and New Year issue 2022. Wilkins interests are primarily in the psychology and structures of problem solving and the subjective experience of thinking. The collaboration has published the following:

 2012: Occam's Typewriter
 2012: Imagination: The Secret Landscape
 2016: Current Biology
 2016: The Psychologist Magazine
 2017: After Nyne
 2017:  The Royal Society Interface
 2018: The Seven Myths of Memory
 2019: Tricks of the Mind. Experiencing the Impossible. Current Biology. Book review.
 2019: Mind Tricks. Magic and mysticism reveal cognitive shortcuts with implications beyond entertainment. Science (journal)
 2019:  Reflections on the Spoon Test. Neuropsychologia
 2020:  An unexpected audience. Science (journal)
 2021:  Exploring the perceptual inabilities of Eurasian jays (Garrulus glandarius) using magic effects. PNAS
 2021: Schnell, A. K., Loconsole, M., Garcia-Pelegrin, E., Wilkins, C. & Clayton, N. S.. Jays are sensitive to cognitive illusions. Royal Society Open Science, 8, 202358
 2021: Garcia-Pelegrin, E., Wilkins, C. & Clayton, N. S.. The ape that lived to tell the tale. The evolution of the art of storytelling and its relationship to Mental Time Travel and Theory of Mind. Frontiers in Psychology 12, 755-783
 2022: Garcia-Pelegrin, E., Schnell, A. K., Wilkins, C. & Clayton, N. S.. Could it be Protomagic? Deceptive tactics in non-human animals resemble magician’s misdirection. Psychology of Consciousness: Theory, Research and Practice, in press
 2022: Garcia-Pelegrin, E., Wilkins, C. & Clayton, N. S.. Are magicians specialists at identifying deceptive motion? The role of expertise in being fooled by sleight of hand. Scientific Reports, in press

Awards and honours
Wilkins won joint second prize in the Hunting Art Awards with Tom Phillips in 1988.

References

External links
 The Captured Thought
 Painting of Sir Howard Hodgkin
 Painting of Peter Blake (artist) RA

1954 births
Living people
People from Wolverhampton
British male painters
20th-century British painters
British male novelists
21st-century British novelists
Modernist writers
English magicians
People from Uppingham
20th-century British male artists